Charles William Alfred Marks (21 December 1919 – 19 January 2005) was an English professional footballer. He played for Gillingham for fifteen years, making him one of the longest-serving players in the Kent club's history. He was born in Eccles, near Aylesford, Kent.

Career
As well as playing for various youth and works teams, Marks had spells with Maidstone United and Tooting & Mitcham United before joining Gillingham in 1943. He played 187 matches for the team during their spell in non-league football and, after the team's return to the Football League in 1950, made 265 further league appearances. In 1958, aged nearly 40, he left to join non-league Tonbridge, his final club.

Marks was famous for his fierce shot and once broke the net with a penalty kick.  After leaving football Marks worked as a stock controller in a paper mill. In later life, he lived in Larkfield, near Maidstone.  He died in January 2005 and was survived by his wife Gladys.

References

1919 births
2005 deaths
Association football fullbacks
English footballers
Gillingham F.C. players
Maidstone United F.C. (1897) players
Tooting & Mitcham United F.C. players
Tonbridge Angels F.C. players
English Football League players
People from Tonbridge and Malling (district)